Chirapsina is a genus of moths belonging to the subfamily Tortricinae of the family Tortricidae.

Species
Chirapsina hemixantha (Meyrick, 1918)
Chirapsina expleta (Meyrick, 1923)

See also
List of Tortricidae genera

References

Archipini